Richmond Lewis is an American painter who worked briefly as a comic book colorist. She is married to comic book artist David Mazzucchelli. Coloring was a sideline from her main career as a painter, and occurred mainly because Mazzucchelli wanted to bring Lewis into his world.

Painting Career 
Adelphi University held a solo exhibit, Paintings, of paintings by Lewis in the fall of 2015.

Comic book bibliography

Editor 
Rubber Blanket #1–3 (1991–1993, Rubber Blanket Press)

Writer/artist 
"If It Weren't For Men..." in Rubber Blanket #1 (art by Richmond Lewis)
"Beyond the Last Pier" in Rubber Blanket #1 (text by David Mazzucchelli)

Colorist 
Batman #404–407: "Batman: Year One" (1987, DC Comics)
The Shadow #1–6 (1987–88, DC)
The Prisoner #3 (1988, DC)
Batman: Legends of the Dark Knight #1–5: "Shaman" (1989–90, DC)
Teenage Mutant Ninja Turtles: The Secret of the Ooze – Official Movie Adaptation (1991, Tundra Publishing)
Ironwolf: Fires of the Revolution graphic novel (1992, DC)
Turtle Soup #3–4 (1992, Mirage)
Detective Comics Annual 08 (1995, DC)

References

External links 
 
 Artwork from Ironwolf: Fires of the Revolution

20th-century American painters
American women painters
Living people
American female comics artists
20th-century American women artists
21st-century American women artists
Year of birth missing (living people)